Innocenti is an Italian surname.

Geographical distribution
As of 2014, 87.5% of all known bearers of the surname Innocenti were residents of Italy (frequency 1:2,690), 4.0% of France (1:64,011), 3.4% of the United States (1:405,900), 2.0% of Brazil (1:397,111) and 1.1% of Argentina (1:155,998).

In Italy, the frequency of the surname was higher than national average (1:2,690) only in one region: Tuscany (1:218).

People
Adriana Innocenti (1926–2016), Italian actress
Alessio Innocenti (born 1993), Argentine-born Italian association football player
Antonio Innocenti (1915–2008), Italian cardinal
Azeglio Innocenti (1866–?), Italian Olympic gymnast who competed at the 1906 Intercalated Games
Camillo Innocenti (1871–1961), Italian painter
Danilo Innocenti (1904–1949), Italian Olympic pole vaulter
Dino Innocenti (1913–1971), Italian Olympic ice hockey player
Duccio Innocenti (born 1975), Italian association football player
Fabio Innocenti (born 2002), Italian entrepreneur
Ferdinando Innocenti (1891–1966), Italian businessman
Filiberto Innocenti (1888–?), Italian Olympic gymnast who competed at the 1906 Intercalated Games
Giovanni Innocenti (1888–1975), Italian footballer
Marco Innocenti (born 1978), Italian sport shooter
Marzio Innocenti (born 1958), Italian rugby union player
Paulo Innocenti (1902–1983), Italian-Brazilian association football player
Riccardo Innocenti (footballer, born 1943), Italian association football player
Riccardo Innocenti (footballer, born 1974), Italian association football player

See also
 Innocent (name)

References

Italian-language surnames
Surnames of Italian origin